Jonathan Michael Dorotich (born 27 April 1962) is a former Australian rules footballer who played for the Carlton Football Club in the Australian Football League (AFL) and for the South Fremantle Football Club in the West Australian Football League (WAFL). 

Known as "Doro" he moved to Carlton in 1986 where he played in the grand final in his first season against Hawthorn.  In the following years grand final, he played at full-forward in the rematch with Hawthorn where Carlton won the flag.  

He played in 132 games for Carlton before returning to Western Australia where he co-captained South Fremantle in their 1997 WAFL premiership win.  He played a total of 151 games with the Bulldogs, and won the best and fairest award in 1985. He won the Bernie Naylor Medal as the WAFL's leading goalscorer twice, in 1996 with 88 goals and 107 the following year. His height was 193 cm and his weight was 103 kg.

In interstate games, Dorotich played in six State Of Origin football games for Western Australia, winning the 1997 Simpson Medal against Tasmania

Since retiring from playing, he's been a commentator for the ABC television's coverage of the WAFL.

References
Carlton FC bio
ABC Perth bio

Carlton Football Club players
Carlton Football Club Premiership players
Western Australian State of Origin players
South Fremantle Football Club players
Australian rules footballers from Fremantle
Australian rules football commentators
Australian television presenters
1962 births
Living people
Australian people of Croatian descent
One-time VFL/AFL Premiership players